Graham Hilford Pollard is an Australian mathematician, professor, statistician, author, lecturer, and Doctor in Mathematics, recognised for being the recipient of the David Hilbert Award in 1991.

Career

In 1976, he received his PhD from the Australian National University with the thesis entitled A Stochastic Analysis of Scoring Systems.

He is a lecturer in statistics at the Canberra College of Advance Education since 1982, and currently serves as Chairman of the editorial committee of the Australian Mathematics Trust publishing house.

In 1991, he received the David Hilbert Award from the World Federation of National Mathematics Competitions.

Most of his papers have been published by the Australian & New Zealand Journal of Statistics, Journal of Mathematics Competitions, the Journal of Educational Studies in Mathematics, the Journal of the Australian Mathematical Society, and the International Journal of Mathematical Education in Science and Technology.

Academic papers

References

Australian statisticians
Year of birth missing (living people)
Living people
Australian National University alumni